The 2008 Cherwell District Council election took place on 1 May 2008 to elect members of Cherwell District Council in Oxfordshire, England. One third of the council was up for election and the Conservative Party stayed in overall control of the council.

The results saw the Conservatives win all of the seats that were contested in the election in a clean sweep. They gained 2 seats from Labour to have 44 of the 50 seats on the council, while the Liberal Democrats were not defending any seats in the election. In Banbury Neithrop ward, Martin Weir, a former Labour party member who joined the Conservatives earlier in the year, defeated his former colleague and mayor Surinder Dhesi to take the seat. The other gain came in Banbury Ruscote, with the defeats for Labour being blamed on the national political situation. The results meant that Labour were reduced to holding only 2 seats on the council behind the Liberal Democrats on 4.

After the election, the composition of the council was:
Conservative 44
Liberal Democrat 4
Labour 2

Election result

Ward results

References

2008 English local elections
2008
2000s in Oxfordshire